Adrian Ghenie (born 13 August 1977 in Baia Mare) is a contemporary Romanian painter, who lives and works in Berlin, Germany.

Early life and education 
The son of a dentist, he studied fine arts at the Arts and Crafts School in Baia Mare between 1991 and 1994.
He is a graduate of the Art and Design University of Cluj-Napoca (2001).

Career

Ghenie lives and works in Cluj, Berlin, and London.
In 2005, he co-founded Galeria Plan B in Cluj, together with Mihai Pop, a production and exhibition space for contemporary art. In 2008 Plan B opened a permanent exhibition space in Berlin.

His work has been widely exhibited in group and solo exhibitions, including at Tate Liverpool, San Francisco Museum of Modern Art and Fondazione Palazzo Strozzi in Florence.

In June 2014 the oil on canvas painting "The Fake Rothko" was sold for £1,426,000 ($2,428,140).

In February 2016, the large oil on canvas painting "The Sunflowers of 1937" inspired by Vincent van Gogh's famous "Sunflowers" was sold in London for £3,177,000 at a Sotheby's auction, marking it the most expensive painting sold by the Romanian artist.

Before the auction, the value of the painting was estimated between £400,000 and £600,000. It belonged to the Galerie Judin of Berlin, who had purchased it from the artist.

Collections

Ghenie's work is represented in numerous major museum and public collections including the Centre Georges Pompidou, the Hammer Museum, Los Angeles, the Museum of Contemporary Art, Los Angeles, the Museum of Modern Art, Antwerp, San Francisco Museum of Modern Art, and Stedelijk Museum voor Actuele Kunst, Ghent.

Style and technique

Ghenie does not use traditional tools of the painter or brushes, but a palette knife and stencils.
He paints portraits of 20th century figures, particularly those associated with genocide and mass suffering, that appear in his work gnawed and slashed, blurred and speckled.

His painterly style has been compared to that of Francis Bacon.

Exhibitions

References

External links

www.nolan-judin.de

1977 births
Romanian expatriates in Germany
Living people
People from Baia Mare
Romanian artists
20th-century Romanian painters
21st-century Romanian painters